Poquoson High School is a public secondary school, located in Poquoson, Virginia and serves as the sole public secondary school for students in the City. The school was opened in 1910 and currently has approximately 700 students.  The school competes in athletics and activities in the Virginia High School League's AA Bay Rivers District.  Poquoson High has historically been known for its wrestling program, which has won numerous state championships and has occasionally been ranked nationally.

History
Poquoson High was founded in 1910 as the high school for York County. It was housed in a wooden building that resembles a large house. In 1932, the High School was moved into 965 Poquoson Avenue, which was next door to the first building.  The High School continued to grow along with the rest of the area, even after the Town of Poquoson was incorporated in 1952.  As Langley Air Force Base and the NASA Langley Research Center grew into prominence, the High School's enrollment grew. Poquoson became an independent city in 1975 primarily to gain more local control of its schools, including Poquoson High.  Poquoson High moved from the single-A to double-A level in high school athletics in the late 1970s and gained a reputation for quality academics.

Feeder patterns
The following elementary schools feed into PHS:
 Poquoson Primary School (Grades K-2)
 Poquoson Elementary School (Grades 3-5)
 Poquoson Middle School (Grades 6-8)

All residents are zoned to these schools as there are no other public schools in the City.

Accreditation and rankings
Poquoson High is fully accredited by the Virginia Department of Education and has been accredited by the Southern Association of Colleges and Schools since 1972.

Poquoson High was ranked 781st in the most recent U.S. News & World Report ranking of America's Top 1000 High Schools in 2013. The school was ranked 712th in 2007, 798th in 2006, and 635th in 2005.

Poquoson was also ranked amongst the top 100 communities for music education by the American Music Conference in 2006.

Enrollment history

Athletics and interscholastic competition
Poquoson High School competes in the Virginia High School's AA Division, Region I, Bay Rivers District.  The school competes in the following sports:

Poquoson High School also fields competitive teams in these areas:

Scholastic Bowl - Poquoson High won the AA state championship in 2001.

Debate

Forensics

One-Act Theatre

Sailing
Poquoson High is one of 54 schools in the Mid-Atlantic states and one of three public schools in Hampton Roads to sponsor a varsity level sailing team.

Wrestling
Poquoson High School has a distinguished history in wrestling, winning state titles in 1973, 1975, 1977, 1978, 1979, 1980, 1981, 1985, 1999, 2018, 2019, 2020 and 2021. Additionally, the school placed second in the state tournament many times in the 1980s and 1990s to Grundy Senior High School which produced an intense rivalry between the schools which are eight hours or about 425 miles driving distance apart. The program has produced over 70 individual state titles and one wrestler for the U.S national wrestling team. Three former wrestlers have won four state titles during their times with the team - Charles "Butch" Backus, Mike Akers and Patrick McCormick.

Odyssey of the Mind
Poquoson High, like its feeder schools, has had a positive history with its Odyssey of the Mind.   Teams from the school have won numerous district and state titles.  This decade, Poquoson teams have also won in the World Tournament (2000 and 2001) and placed in 2002 (3rd place - It's a Snap Division III), 2004 (13th place - Balancing Act Division III), and 2005 (6th place - Problem 4 Crazy Columns Division III).

Marching Band
Poquoson High School's marching band program is a 9-time honor band, as accredited by the Virginia Band and Orchestra Directors Association.

Facilities
Poquoson High School now occupies its third building in its history.  Poquoson High's second building, which housed the school from the 1930s to 1976
, now houses Poquoson Middle School.  The school moved into its current facility in 1977, and the building has undergone two additions and renovations, one in 1977 and one in 1998. The football stadium, where football and soccer games are played, is located off campus at Poquoson Middle School.  Facilities for the wrestling team are located adjacent to the football stadium.

Partner schools
Poquoson has two current partner schools.
 Balboa Academy, Panama
 Uruguayan American School, Uruguay

Alumni
Kyle Crockett, Major League Baseball player.
Chad Pinder, Major League Baseball player.
Baiju Bhatt, co-founder of Robinhood.
Richard Tyler Blevins, American Twitch Streamer, YouTuber, and professional gamer.

References

External links
Poquoson High School
Poquoson High School Athletics

Schools in Poquoson, Virginia
Public high schools in Virginia
Educational institutions established in 1910
1910 establishments in Virginia